Sollie Paul "Tex" Williams (August 23, 1917 – October 11, 1985) was an American Western swing musician. He is best known for his talking blues style; his biggest hit was the novelty song, "Smoke! Smoke! Smoke! (That Cigarette)", which held the number one position on the Billboard chart for sixteen weeks in 1947. "Smoke" was the No. 5 song on Billboard's Top 100 list for 1947, and was No. 1 on the country chart that year. It can be heard during the opening credits of the 2006 movie, Thank You for Smoking.

Life and career
He was born in Ramsey, Illinois, United States. Williams started out in the early 1940s as vocalist for the band of Western swing king Spade Cooley, based in Venice, California.

Williams' backing band, The Western Caravan, numbered about a dozen members. They originally played polkas for Capitol Records, and later saw success with "Smoke, Smoke, Smoke" written in large part by Merle Travis.

In April 1956, Williams appeared on the Chrysler-sponsored CBS TV broadcast, Shower of Stars.

Williams died of pancreatic cancer on October 11, 1985.

Filmography
Williams and the Western Caravan appeared in the following films: 
 Tex Williams and His Western Caravan (1947)
 Tex Williams & Orchestra in Western Whoopee (1948)
 The Pecos Pistol (1949)
 Tex Williams' Western Varieties (1951)

Discography

Albums

Singles

A"The Night Miss Nancy Ann's Hotel for Single Girls Burned Down" peaked at No. 27 on the RPM Country Tracks chart in Canada.

Notes

References
Kienzle, Rich. Southwest Shuffle: Pioneers of Honky Tonk, Western Swing, and Country Jazz. New York: Routledge, 2003. 
Whitburn, Joel. The Billboard Book of Top 40 Country Hits. Billboard Books, 2006.

External links
 
 [ Tex Williams at Allmusic]

1917 births
1985 deaths
Deaths from pancreatic cancer
Deaths from cancer in California
Western swing performers
American country singer-songwriters
People from Ramsey, Illinois
American comedy musicians
RCA Victor artists
Capitol Records artists
Shasta Records artists
Liberty Records artists
Monument Records artists
20th-century American singers
Singer-songwriters from Illinois
Comedians from Illinois
20th-century American comedians
Country musicians from Illinois